John Thomas Spencer (born 1898) was an English footballer who played in the Football League for Hartlepools United and Stoke.

Career 
Spencer was born in Stockton-on-Tees and played amateur football with Grangetown St Mary's, Eston United and Crook Town before being spotted by scouts at Football League club Stoke in 1920. He had a reputation as a promising outside right but failed to impress at Stoke as he played 16 times during the 1920–21 season as the club almost suffered relegation. He returned north at the end of the season to South Bank and played a single match for Hartlepools United in September 1922.

Career statistics

References 

1898 births
Footballers from Stockton-on-Tees
Footballers from County Durham
English footballers
Association football outside forwards
Crook Town A.F.C. players
Stoke City F.C. players
South Bank F.C. players
Hartlepool United F.C. players
English Football League players
Year of death missing
Date of birth missing